Khoo Boon Hui, born in 1954 in Singapore, is the Senior Deputy Secretary of the Ministry of Home Affairs. Mr Khoo Boon Hui succeeded  Jackie Selebi and Arturo Verdugo (acting) as President of INTERPOL, from 2008 to 2012, and he was succeeded by Mireille Ballestrazzi. He was formerly the Commissioner of the Singapore Police from July 1997 to January 2010.

Education History
As a young man, Khoo completed his secondary education at Anglo-Chinese School and was awarded the prestigious Singapore Armed Forces Overseas Scholarship (SAFOS) in 1973.

Khoo obtained his Bachelor of Arts (Engineering & Economics) from St John's College, Oxford University in 1976 and his Master in Public Administration from the Kennedy School of Government, Harvard in 1982. He attended the Advanced Management Program at Wharton in 2002.

Career
As a government scholar, after his graduation from Oxford in 1976, he was invited to join the Singapore Police Force (SPF) after a short stint in the Singapore Armed Forces. He began his career in 1977 and has since held various appointments, including Director Strategic Planning in 1987, Police Chief of Staff in 1990, Director of Criminal Investigation Department in 1991 and Deputy Commissioner of Police in 1995.

In July 1997, he was appointed Commissioner of the Singapore Police Force. Khoo held the post for 14 years and was succeeded by Ng Joo Hee on February 1, 2010, taking on a new post of Senior Deputy Secretary at the Ministry of Home Affairs.

In 2017, Khoo was appointed to the Global Commission on the Stability of Cyberspace, and he served on the commission until its successful conclusion in 2019, participating in the drafting of its eight norms related to non-aggression in cyberspace.

Interpol
Khoo served as one of three vice-presidents on the Interpol Executive Committee from 2006 to 2009. On October 9, 2008, Khoo was elected as the president of INTERPOL for a four-year term (2008-2012).

Awards and recognition
For his contribution to the police service, he was awarded the Public Administration Medal (Silver) in 1992, the Long Service Medal in 1998 as well as the Meritorious Service Medal and 2nd Clasp to the Singapore Police Service Long Service in 2003.

He was also conferred the Knight Grand Cross (First Class) of the Most Noble Order of the Crown of Thailand by the King of Thailand in March 2002, the Bintang Bhayangkara Utama (National Police Meritorious Service Star) by the President of Indonesia in June 2002 and the Panglima Gagah Pasukan Polis (Kerhormat) (Knight Grand Commander, Order of Police Heroism) by the Yang di-Pertuan Agong of Malaysia in April 2003. In July 2004, Khoo was conferred the Darjah Pahlawan Negara Brunei Yang Amat Perkasa Darjah Pertama (Order of the Hero of the State of Brunei, First Class) by the Sultan and Yang Di-Pertuan of Brunei Darussalam and it comes with the title of Dato Seri Pahlawan.

In Aug 2005, His Majesty Seri Paduka Baginda Yang di-Pertuan Agong XII of Malaysia conferred the Award, Darjah Kebesaran Panglima Setia Mahkota (Kerhormat) (PSM) to Khoo. The award, literally translated as Commander of the Most Distinguished Order of the Crown (Honorary).

Personal
Khoo is married to Puan Sri Betty Au. The couple have two children.

References 

Singaporean police chiefs
Anglo-Chinese School alumni
Singaporean people of Hokkien descent
Alumni of St John's College, Oxford
Harvard Kennedy School alumni
Interpol officials
Living people
Honorary Commanders of the Order of Loyalty to the Crown of Malaysia
Honorary Officers of the Order of Australia
Recipients of the Pingat Pentadbiran Awam
Recipients of the Pingat Jasa Gemilang
Recipients of the Long Service Medal (Military) (Singapore)
1954 births
Commissioners of the Global Commission on the Stability of Cyberspace